Parliamentary elections were held in Ivory Coast on 10 December 2000. In 28 seats in the north of the country voting was postponed due to unrest relating to the boycott by the Rally of the Republicans. Although the RDR continued to call for a boycott, 26 seats were eventually elected on 14 January 2001, although turnout was only 13 percent and the two seats for Kong were left vacant.

The result was a victory for the Ivorian Popular Front, which won 96 of the 225 seats in the National Assembly (increased from 175 seats in the previous election). Voter turnout in the first round of voting was just 34 percent, and overall was just 32 percent.

Results

See also
Ivorian Civil War

References

Elections in Ivory Coast
Ivory
Ivory
2000 in Ivory Coast
2001 in Ivory Coast
December 2000 events in Africa
January 2001 events in Africa
Election and referendum articles with incomplete results